Material is the fifth studio album by Japanese singer-songwriter Aco. It was released via Ki/oon Records on May 23, 2001. It peaked at number 19 on the Oricon Albums Chart.

Track listing

Charts

References

External links 
 

2001 albums
Aco (musician) albums
Ki/oon Records albums
Albums produced by Adrian Sherwood